The third season of Akademi Fantasia premiered on the Astro Ria television channel on 4 June 2005. Kudsia Kahar continued to judge the show's contestants, along with Aznil Nawawi as host. Asmawi Ani, a native of FELDA Taib Andak, Kulai, Johor, was announced the winner of the competition on 7 August 2005, defeating runner-up Felix Agus.

As much as 20 contestants were selected before the final 12 contestants were chosen in the prelude concert. However, in this season's first concert, those eight contestants who were eliminated in the prelude concert were given a chance to compete in the first concert in order to be recruited into the competition againas the thirteenth and the fourteenth contestants. This season also continued the format of not eliminating any contestant in the first concert.

As much as 10.7 million votes were cast throughout this entire season.

Semi-final
A prelude concert was held on 21 May 2005 to determine the 12 finalists who would move on into the main competition. Each semi-finalist was given the liberty to choose their own song.

During the Prelude concert, Marsha failed to perform as she was diagnosed with sore throat. Panel of jury was in consensus that her failure to participate in the concert engendered her to be automatically disqualified. Nevertheless, she was called forward on stage and was given a chance to sing the first verse of her song with no music. Below is the list of semi-finalists who did not make it to the Top 12.

 Asmawi Ani, 23, Kulai, Johor
 Azlif Suhaizad Abdullah, 23, Johor Bahru, Johor
 Haider Arif, 20, Kota Kinabalu, Sabah
 Hazrina binti Illias, 21, Sri Manjung, Perak
 Isa Kumar Jali Sulaiman, 19, Kota Samarahan, Sarawak
 Marsha Milan Londoh, 20, Tamparuli, Sabah
 Nor Diana Akmar Tajul Ariffin, 22, Kuala Lumpur
 Nurshiha Mohd Zikir, 18, Gombak, Selangor

Concert summaries

Week 1 

Original Airdate: 4 June 2005

Note: There was no elimination in this concert. All the semi-finalists were given another chance to perform in order to be re-entered into the competition. At the end of the concert, Marsha and Mawi were re-entered into the competition through 'AFSERAP' (Faculty's choice).
Guest judges: Abdul Razak Mohaideen & Aishah

Week 2 

Original Airdate: 11 June 2005

Guest judges: Adlin Aman Ramlie & Hattan

Week 3 

Original Airdate: 18 June 2005

Guest judges: Afdlin Shauki & Shahruddin (Dean)

Week 4 

Original Airdate: 25 June 2005

Guest judges: Fauzi Marzuki & Syafinaz Selamat

Week 5 

Original Airdate: 2 July 2005

Guest judges: Mamat Khalid & Ning Baizura

Week 6 

Original Airdate: 9 July 2005

Guest judges: Iman Wan & Sharifah Aini

Week 7 

Original Airdate: 16 July 2005

Guest judges: S. Atan & Zainal Alam Kadir

Week 8 

Original Airdate: 23 July 2005

Guest judges: Syafinaz Selamat & Yasmin Ahmad

Week 9 

Original Airdate: 30 July 2005

Guest judges: Suraya Al Attas & Vince Chong

Week 10 

Original Airdate: 6 August 2005

Guest judges: Adlin Aman Ramlie & Syafinaz Selamat

Students
(ages stated are at time of contest)

Post Akademi Fantasia Careers
Elliza Abdul Razak is currently active in acting in serial drama.
Syaiful Reza Mohamed was chosen as a host of interactive show Durian Runtuh in Astro Ria. He is also one of the deejays in ERA fm. In 2006, he appeared in the filming entertainment as "Azam" in a film entitled Malaikat Maut directed by Bade Hj Azmi. In 2008, he was chosen to be the host for a new TV show in Astro Ria called Kelab POP.
Asiah Tunakma Abdullah has released her first single entitled Percaya Pada Cinta in 2007.
Mohd Yazer Yusof has signed with a recording label, Luncai Emas and is currently recording his first album.
Marsha Milan Londoh is currently the ambassador for Power Root. She is also active in acting and has appeared in several telemovies and dramas such as Begitulah Raya, Misi:1511, Kirana and recently in Kerana Karina as the main cast.
Felix Agus is also one of the ambassadors for Power Root. He has also appeared in acting entertainment with fellow Marsha Milan Londoh in Begitulah Raya. His compilation album The Best of Felix Susah Susah Aje!! achieved platinum status while his video compilation of the same title went gold.
Asmawi Ani was chosen as the Chosen Artist of DiGi in ERA Award 2005. In the same year as well, he won the Most Popular Artist in Anugerah Bintang Popular, and garnered other several awards such as Best New Male Artist, and Best New Male Singer, all in the same year in the prestigious award. In 2006, he won the Most Popular Song in Planet Music Award, Favourite Malaysian Artist of MTV Asia Award and won the ethnic creative song in Anugerah Juara Lagu 2006. He is also chosen to be ambassador for many products such as Power Root, Mamee Slurp, M.Mobile, Canon, Silky For Men, and Herba.

Summaries

Elimination Chart

 The student won the competition
 The student was the runner-up
 The student was the first runner-up
 The student was finalist
 The student was the original eliminee but was saved
 The students were re-entered into the competition through Principal's choice or 'AFSERAP'
 The student did not participate in the concert and was disqualified
 The student was eliminated

In Prelude, the group of 20 contestants were reduced to 12 that would move on to the main competition as the new AF students. This first call-out does not reflect their performance in this week.
In Week 1, there was no elimination. Subsequently, Mawi and Marsha were chosen by the Principal to be re-entered into the competition through 'AFSERAP', after their failures to be chosen in Prelude Concert.
In Week 5, there was a double elimination. The concert was held in Dataran Putrajaya.
In Week 9, there was another double elimination.

Cast members

Hosts
 Aznil Nawawi - Weekly Concert & Diaries

Professional trainers
 M. Nasir - Principal
 Adnan Abu Hassan - Vocal Technical
 Mohd Fathee Abdullah - Choreographer
 Linda Jasmine - Choreographer
 Dr. Azahari Othman - Motivator Consultant
 Fatimah Abu Bakar - Student Consultant & English Consultant
 Marlia Musa - Stage Presentation
 Siti Hajar Ismail - Voice Tone
 Mahani Awang - Image Consultant
 Roslina Hassan - Resident Manager

Judge
 Kudsia Kahar

Season statistics
Total number of students: 14
Oldest student: Syaiful Reza Mohamed, 27 years old
Youngest student: Amylea Azizan, 19 years old
Tallest student: Felix Agus, 5'9" (180 cm)
Shortest student: Amylea Azizan & Norashikin Abdul Rahman, both 4'8" (149 cm)
Heaviest student: Fuad Razlan Abdul Azri, 154 lb (70 kg)
Lightest student: Amylea Azizan & Norashikin Abdul Rahman, both 92 lb (42 kg)

References

External links
 Official Site
 Weekly Concert of Akademi Fantasia

Akademi Fantasia seasons
2005 Malaysian television seasons